Socket A (also known as Socket 462) is a zero insertion force pin grid array (PGA) CPU socket used for AMD processors ranging from the Athlon Thunderbird to the Athlon XP/MP 3200+, and AMD budget processors including the Duron and Sempron. Socket A also supports AMD Geode NX embedded processors (derived from the Mobile Athlon XP).  The socket is a zero insertion force pin grid array type with 462 pins (nine pins are blocked in the socket to prevent accidental insertion of Socket 370 CPUs, hence the number 462). The front-side bus frequencies supported for the AMD Athlon XP and Sempron are 133 MHz, 166 MHz, and 200 MHz. Socket A supports 32-bit CPUs only.

Socket A was replaced by Socket 754 and Socket 939 during 2003 and 2004 respectively, except for its use with Geode NX processors.

Technical specifications 
 Support of processor clock-speeds between 600 MHz (Duron) to 2333 MHz (Athlon XP 3200+)
 Double data rate 100, 133, 166 and 200 MHz front-side bus on Duron, XP and Sempron processors, based on the Alpha 21264 EV6 bus.
 
Initially launched with 100 MHz FSB support in the earliest chipsets it evolved stepwise to faster 200 MHz FSB while maintaining pin compatibility throughout its lifetime. However, clock, timing, BIOS and voltage differences restrict compatibility between older chipsets and later processors.

Socket dimensions are 5.59 cm (5.24 cm without lever) × 6.55 cm or 2.2" (2.06" without lever) × 2.58".

Heatsink 
Heatsinks were commonly attached directly to the CPU socket, but some motherboards also had 4 holes for fastening bigger heatsinks to the motherboard. Those holes are placed in a rectangle with lateral lengths of 35 mm and 65 mm.

Socket A mechanical load limits 

AMD recommends that the mass of a Socket A CPU cooler to not exceed 300 grams (10.6 ounces). Heavier coolers may result in damage to the die when the system is not properly handled.

All socket A processors (Athlon, Sempron, Duron and Geode NX) have the following mechanical maximum load limits which should not be exceeded during heatsink assembly, shipping conditions, or standard use. Load above those limits may crack the processor die and make it unusable.

Those load limits are quite small compared to the load limits of Socket 478 processors. Indeed, they were so small that many users ended up with cracked processors while trying to remove or attach heatsinks to their fragile processor core. This made installing non-standard or non-certified heatsink solutions a risky business. OEM aluminium heatsinks typically provided small thermal tolerances so the improper application or absence of a thermal pad or thermal grease, or operation in high room temperatures, could lead to some Socket A CPUs overheating and crashing.

Chipsets

In practice third party chipsets were heavily favoured by motherboard manufacturers. Stability problems and compatibility quirks abounded from manufacturers not following chipset designers' guidelines which in turn caused lasting damage to AMD's reputation despite AMD having nothing to do with the poorly realised hardware.

Third-party chipsets include the nForce, nForce2, and a large number of VIA K-series chipsets.

See also 
 List of AMD microprocessors

References 

AMD sockets